The Patna–Sonepur–Hajipur section is a railway line connecting Patna to Hajipur in the Indian state of Bihar. The  line passes through the Digha–Sonpur rail–road bridge, connecting South Bihar and North Bihar, and the Gangetic Plain in Bihar. The electrification work in Patna–Sonepur–Hajipur section was completed by July 2016.

References

5 ft 6 in gauge railways in India
Railway lines in Bihar
Transport in Hajipur